Eupithecia affinata is a moth in the family Geometridae first described by Pearsall in 1908. It is found in North America, including Pennsylvania, New Jersey, New York, Maryland, Maine, Michigan, North Carolina, West Virginia, Kentucky, Ontario and Quebec. It has also been recorded from Arizona and California.

Adults are light fawn gray with a prominent black discal dot on the forewings.

References

Moths described in 1908
affinata
Moths of North America